Sleightholme was an early, short lived railway station near Newton Arlosh, Cumbria on the Carlisle & Silloth Bay Railway & Dock Company's branch from  to 

The station served the small hamlet of Newton Arlosh and its rural surrounds, but was named after a farm which was nearer than the village.

Its timetable entries show trains calling on Saturdays Only. It only appeared in public timetables from September 1856 to June 1857.

By 1866 no trace of the station could be seen on OS maps.

The line through the station site closed on 7 September 1964.

History 
The North British Railway (NBR) leased the line from the Carlisle & Silloth Bay Railway & Dock Company in 1862, and absorbed them in 1880, The NBR, in turn, was absorbed into the London and North Eastern Railway in 1923, passing to British Railways in 1948.

References

Sources

External links
 The station site on an Edwardian 6" OS map National Library of Scotland
 The line with period photographs Holme St Cuthbert History Group
 The station and line Cumbria Gazetteer
 The station and line Rail Map Online

Disused railway stations in Cumbria
Railway stations in Great Britain opened in 1856
Railway stations in Great Britain closed in 1857
1856 establishments in England